The 1988 United States Senate election in Delaware was held on November 8, 1988. Incumbent Republican U.S. Senator William Roth won re-election to a fourth term.

Democratic primary

Candidates 
 Shien Biau Woo, Lieutenant Governor of Delaware
 Samuel Beard, investment banker

Results

General election

Candidates 
 William V. Roth (R), incumbent U.S. Senator
 Shien Biau Woo (D), Lieutenant Governor of Delaware

Results

See also 
  1988 United States Senate elections

References 

1988
Delaware
1988 Delaware elections